Freesia is a plant genus in the family Iridaceae.

Freesia may also refer to:
 Freesia (manga), a Japanese manga series
 Freesia alba, a species of the plant genus Freesia
 Freesia laxa, a species of the plant genus Freesia

See also 
 Frisia (disambiguation)
 Phreesia, a healthcare software company